Daniel Mukoko Samba is a politician from the Democratic Republic of the Congo. He serves as the Deputy Prime Minister under President Joseph Kabila. He also serves as Minister of the Budget.

Biography
Daniel Mukoko Samba was born in Mbanza-Ngungu, RDC on May 15, 1959. He received a B.A. in Economics from the University of Kinshasa in 1983, a master's degree in Economics from Oita University in Japan in 1990, and a PhD in Economics from the University of Tsukuba in Japan in 1993.

For sixteen years, he taught as a university professor at the University of Kinshasa, Kongo University and Aichi University of Education in Japan. He also worked for the United Nations for five years.

Bibliography
Estimation des effets spécifiques sur la demande de logement à Kinshasa par le modèle à prix hédonique (2004)
Resilience of an African Giant: Boosting Growth and Development in the Democratic Republic of Congo (co-written with Johannes Herderschee, Kai-alexander Kaiser, World Bank, 2011)
 Guérir le Congo du mal Zaïrois ( French edition), Mukoko Samba, Daniel - amazon.com, https://www.amazon.com/Gu%C3%A9rir-Congo-mal-za%C3%AFrois-French/dp/2806106109/ref=nodl_?dplnkId=d48e43c6-a403-4e73-bfd1-62f225e12339,

References

1959 births
Living people
Democratic Republic of the Congo politicians
21st-century Democratic Republic of the Congo people